Margarete Kühn (4 February 1902 – 12 September 1995) was a German author and art historian. She was the first director of the State Palaces and Gardens Administration in Berlin. She made significant efforts for the preservation of the Berlin Palace and the reconstruction of the Charlottenburg Palace during the post-war period.  
In 1948, she helped the transfer of a medieval manuscript, Riesencodex, the complete compilation of works of St. Hildegard of Bingen from Dresden to Hildegard Abbey through an unofficial channel.

Biography
She studied natural sciences in Munich, but later changed to art history. She also studied in Vienna and Leipzig. In 1928 she received her doctorate in Munich. She joined as an assistant at the Prussian Palace Administration in 1929 and later she became a research assistant at the same institute. Since 1935 she started working with Ernst Gall (1888–1958), then director of the Prussian Palace Administration, and was responsible for Charlottenburg Palace.During the division of Berlin], Kühn protested unsuccessfully against the evacuation of the Berlin Palace by the German People's Police. Following the demolition of the palace by East Berlin magistrate, Kühn and  Hinnerk Scheper, the state curator of Berlin,  moved their office to West Berlin. 

Afterwards a new office of West Berlin Palaces administration was established at Charlottenburg Palace, named as the State Palaces and Gardens Administration. At the end of the war,  Kühn became the first director of the State Palaces and Gardens Administration in Berlin and was involved in the reconstruction of the damaged Charlottenburg Palace. She held the office of director until her retirement in 1969. Following her retirement, Martin Sperlich succeeded her as director. He continued the reconstruction of Charlottenburg Palace until his retirement in 1984. 

She published number of books about Charlottenburg Palace and other Berlin monuments. Between 1958 and 1974 she served as an editor of the journal for art history. From 1962 to 1995, she edited the works of Karl Friedrich Schinkel.  

She died on 12 September 1995 in Berlin.

Awards
Kühn was awarded the Great Federal Cross of Merit and the Ernst Reuter Plaque. 
In 2005, to recognize her efforts for the reconstruction of Charlottenburg Palace, a street in Charlottenburg was named after her.

See also
 Prussian Palaces and Gardens Foundation Berlin-Brandenburg

References

1902 births
1995 deaths
 
German art historians
-
Women and the arts
Historical preservationists
Conservator-restorers